Gnaeus Octavius can refer to:

 , quaestor circa 230 BC
 Gnaeus Octavius (consul 165 BC)
 Gnaeus Octavius (consul 128 BC)
 Gnaeus Octavius (consul 87 BC)
 Gnaeus Octavius (consul 76 BC)

See also 
 Octavius (disambiguation)